Sepicana migsominea is a species of beetle in the family Cerambycidae. It was described by E. Forrest Gilmour in 1949.

References

Tmesisternini
Beetles described in 1949